Muhyiddin Yassin, the 8th prime minister of Malaysia, made four international trips to four countries during his premiership, which began on 1 March 2020 and ended on 21 August 2021. Due to the COVID-19 pandemic, he did not make any international trips in 2020.

Summary 
The number of visits per country where Prime Minister Muhyiddin travelled are:
 One: Saudi Arabia, United Arab Emirates and Brunei
 Two: Indonesia

2021

See also
Foreign relations of Malaysia
List of international prime ministerial trips made by Ismail Sabri Yaakob
List of international prime ministerial trips made by Mahathir Mohamad
List of international prime ministerial trips made by Najib Razak

References 

2021 in international relations
Muhyiddin Yassin
Foreign relations of Malaysia
Muhyiddin Yassin
Muhyiddin Yassin